Ferenc Szentirmai (born 29 November 1983) is a Hungarian-born show jumping rider who has been representing Ukraine since 2010. He competed at the 2016 Summer Olympics in Rio de Janeiro, Brazil, where he placed 13th team and was eliminated in the first round of the individual competition.

Szentirmai competed at the 2014 World Equestrian Games and at the 2015 European Championships. His best result is 8th place in the team event from 2014.

References

1983 births
Living people
Hungarian male equestrians
Ukrainian male equestrians
Show jumping riders
Olympic equestrians of Ukraine
Equestrians at the 2016 Summer Olympics
Place of birth missing (living people)
Naturalized citizens of Ukraine
Hungarian emigrants to Ukraine